The borough of Hastings in East Sussex, England, has three churches called Christ Church:
Christ Church, Blacklands, Hastings serves the Blacklands suburb.
Christ Church, Ore serves Ore and Ore Valley.
Christ Church, St Leonards-on-Sea serves the formerly separate town of St Leonards-on-Sea.

See also
Christ Church (disambiguation)